The Men's Greco-Roman 59 kg is a competition featured at the 2014 European Wrestling Championships, and was held in Vantaa, Finland on 5 April 2014.

Medalists

Results
Legend
F — Won by fall

Final

Top half

Bottom half

Repechage

References

External links
Draw

Men's Greco-Roman 59 kg